Bénouville may refer to several communes in France:

Bénouville, Calvados, in the Calvados département
Bénouville, Seine-Maritime, in the Seine-Maritime département